De'Marlio Shakie Brown-Sterling (born 12 September 2001) is an English footballer who plays for Bolton Wanderers.

Club career

Bolton Wanderers
Brown-Sterling made his professional debut for Bolton Wanderers on 13 August 2019 in a 5–2 away defeat to Rochdale in the EFL Cup.

Brown-Sterling made his home debut for Bolton Wanderers on 24 August 2019 in a 5-0 defeat to Ipswich.

Brown-Sterling then went on to feature in the EFL cup tie vs Bradford which ended in a 5-4 loss on penalties.

After Bolton
In October 2020 he had a trial with Sheffield Wednesday and played for their U23 team.

Career statistics

References
 
https://www.efl.com/siteassets/image/202021/efl-professional-retain-list---2019-20.pdf
https://www.skysports.com/football/player/170721/demarlio-brown-sterling

External links

Living people
2001 births
English footballers
Association football midfielders
Bolton Wanderers F.C. players
English Football League players